Kilkieran High Crosses are a group of high crosses which form a National Monument in County Kilkenny, Ireland.

Location

History
Kilkieran was formerly a monastery dedicated to Ciarán of Saighir.
The high crosses at Kilkieran were erected in the 9th century, and form part of the West Ossory group, including the Killamery High Cross, Ahenny and Kilree. Local legend claims that the tall North Cross was once destroyed in an act of iconoclasm, but was painstakingly reconstructed in the mid-19th century by blind local stonemason Paddy Laurence, who had lost his sight while working on the Palace of Westminster in London.

Crosses
The crosses are made of sandstone; there are three of them and the fragments of a fourth.

West Cross
Carvings include eight horsemen, chrysanthemums, Celtic interlace and a mitre-like crown.

North Cross

Plain Cross

Other artefacts

A phallic-shaped standing stone is near the wall, near St. Ciarán's holy well, which is near a bullaun and a holy water font.

References

National Monuments in County Kilkenny
High crosses in the Republic of Ireland
Religion in County Kilkenny